Helimenes Leopoldo Castillo Atencio (born 30 September 1946 in Maracaibo, Venezuela) also known as The Citizen is a Venezuelan lawyer, talk show host and political commentator. Castillo is best known for hosting the television program Aló Ciudadano on Globovisión, which gave citizens the right to speak both to defend themselves and to reply to any news that was on the air and was born in response to the president's Aló Presidente program, Hugo Chávez.

Aló Ciudadano was on the air for twelve years and stopped broadcast on August 16, 2013 in a last broadcast where multiple journalists were being fired or resigned.

On January 14, 2020, Leopold was appointed by the National Assembly of Venezuela as president of multistate news television network Telesur. He is currently based in Miami, with a new informative television program on MiraTV entitled Ciudadano.

References 

Living people
1946 births
People from Maracaibo
20th-century Venezuelan lawyers
Political commentators
21st-century Venezuelan lawyers